Hydnellum concrescens is an inedible fungus, commonly known as the zoned hydnellum or zoned tooth fungus. As with other tooth fungi, the spores are produced on spines on the underside of the cap, rather than gills. The cap may also have radial ridges extending from the center to the margins. The spines are pink in young specimens, but turn brown with age.

This species is very similar in appearance to Hydnellum scrobiculatum, and traditionally, largely unreliable microscopic characteristics such as spore size and ornamentation have been used to distinguish between the two. Recent research has demonstrated a way to discriminate the two species using DNA sequencing of the ITS regions.

References

External links
Index Fungorum synonyms
Roger's Mushrooms picture and description
healing-mushrooms.net description, bioactive compounds and medicinal properties

Inedible fungi
concrescens
Fungi of Europe
Fungi described in 1796